A slingback is a type of woman's footwear characterized by an ankle strap that crosses only around the back and sides of the ankle and heel, whereas a typical strap completely encircles the ankle all the way around it.
It typically has a low vamp front similar to that of classic full shoe heels.

Slingbacks can be considered a type of sandal and come in a wide variety of styles from casual to dressy, with heel heights ranging from flat to medium and sometimes high,
heel types ranging from as thin as a stiletto to as thick as wedges and they can be both closed or open-toe.

Slingback straps are usually adjustable through a buckle or an elastic segment, allowing the wearer to slip their foot into the sandal easily without the need to make further (or any) manual adjustment to the strap or buckle, while still holding the foot in the sandal relatively securely. The buckle can be made of metal, plastic, or even sometimes stone.

Classic designs include Chanel's two-tone slingback, introduced in 1957 and relaunched in 2015 by designer Karl Lagerfeld.

References

Sandals